Shropshire Archives is located in Shrewsbury, England, and is the archives and local studies service for the historic county of Shropshire, which includes the borough of Telford and Wrekin.

It preserves and makes accessible documents, books, maps, photographs, plans and drawings relating to Shropshire and its people dating from the early 12th to the 21st century.

Shropshire Archives is funded by Shropshire Council and Telford and Wrekin Borough Council and is supported by an active friends organisation - the Friends of Shropshire Archives. The service has attracted external funding from bodies such as the Heritage Lottery Fund  and the Arts Council.

History 

In 1995 the County Record Office and Local Studies Library were brought together in a purpose built building just off Castle Gates in Shrewsbury town centre. From 1995 to 2003, the building was known as the Shropshire Records and Research Centre. After consultation, in 2003 the name was changed to "Shropshire Archives - gateway to the history of Shropshire and Telford".

Outside the building, in the courtyard, is a mosaic showing the historic extent of Shropshire with a leopard and the county motto "" / "May Shropshire Flourish". The area where the building now stands was formerly "Blower's Repository" (for furniture) and is located just below the main Shrewsbury Library building. Steps lead down from the courtyard to the town's bus station further down the hill.   In 2008 a plaque was unveiled at the archive to commemorate the 725th anniversary of the execution at Shrewsbury of the last native prince of Wales, .

Material held 

Records held at Shropshire Archives include parish registers for Shropshire, local government records for the county, school records for the county, records of the boroughs of Shrewsbury, Bridgnorth, Ludlow and Much Wenlock, court records including quarter sessions and coroner's records and some records of the King's Shropshire Light Infantry. The service also collects maps, newspapers and photographs, as well as the county's largest collection of books, pamphlets and periodicals about Shropshire. Also available for research are microfiche copies of census returns for Shropshire and microfiche copies of the GRO index (an index of the General Register Office's birth, marriage and death certificates). The service also holds the archives of many of the great estates in Shropshire including the Hill family of Attingham Park and Hawkstone Park, and the Duke of Sutherland's Lilleshall estates. The service has an online catalogue containing over 260,000 entries.

References

External links 
 Shropshire Archives
 Volunteering for Shropshire's Heritage

Archives in Shropshire
Organizations established in 1995
County record offices in England